Encyclia alboxanthina  is a species of orchid.

References

External links
 
 

alboxanthina